Francis Herbert Goldsborough (July 16, 1910 – July 16, 1930) was a record-holding aviator who died in a plane crash in Vermont on his 20th birthday.

Early years
Goldsborough was born in Washington, D.C. His father was Brice Goldsborough, who died in a plane crash as Frances Wilson Grayson's navigator on an attempted crossing of the Atlantic Ocean from Newfoundland. Frank's stepmother was named Gertrude. By the time he was 18 the family was living in New York where he attended Flushing High School in Queens.

Transcontinental speed record
Goldsborough held the junior transcontinental air speed record until his death. In April and May 1930 he wrote a series of exclusive first-person accounts for The New York Times about his exploits in the National Air Tour and his breaking of the transcontinental air speed record.

Death
Goldsborough's plane crashed in Vermont on July 15, 1930 only a day short of his 20th birthday. His passenger, Don Mockler, walked away from the crash, dazed but alive, and went for help. Goldsborough was trapped in the wreckage with a head injury for 18 hours before he was rescued, alive but not conscious. All his teeth had been knocked out. He was carried away by rescuers on a makeshift stretcher made from a parachute to the home of Harry C. Jenkins.

Goldsborough died on July 16, 1930, at Putnam Memorial Hospital in Bennington on his 20th birthday, without regaining consciousness.

Funeral
He was buried on July 19, 1930 at Woodlawn Cemetery in the Bronx. Charles Lindbergh sent flowers. His body was moved by his stepmother and reburied on 30 July 1930 to Kensico Cemetery in Valhalla, Westchester County, New York. His stepmother, Gertrude Jacobi Goldsborough, and her mother Anna Marie Hoehn Jacobi are buried there as well.

Timeline
 1910 Birth
 1930 Set transcontinental airspeed record
 1930 US Census at 4114 75th Street in Queens, New York
 1930 Died in crash in Vermont

Junior transcontinental air speed record holders
 1930 Frank Herbert Goldsborough.
 1930 Eddie August Schneider.
 1930 Robert Nietzel Buck.

See also
 1930 in aviation

References

Further reading

 The New York Times; April 29, 1930; page 18: "Boy flies from St. Louis to Westfield, New Jersey: by Frank Goldsborough. Frank Goldsborough Completes First Leg of Transcontinental Flight for Junior Record. Robertson, Missouri, April 28, 1930. Left Westfield at 7 o'clock this morning and arrived at St. Louis at 7 P.M. I made wonderful time with the aid ..."
 The New York Times, April 30, 1930, page 05: "Goldsborough held at Tulsa by weather: by Frank Goldsborough"
 The New York Times, May 1, 1930, page 36: "Goldsborough bucks wind"
 The New York Times, May 4, 1930, page 03: "Goldsborough forced back by storm: by Frank Goldsborough"
 The New York Times, May 5, 1930, page 33: "Goldsborough ends flight with record: by Frank Goldsborough. New York Boy Lands at Los Angeles, Cutting 14 Hours Off Junior Coast-to-Coast Mark. Braved Bad Weather. Youth Spent 34 Hours and 3 Minutes in Air on Trip From Westfield, New Jersey Former Record Was 48 Hours. Los Angeles, California; May 4, 1930. Rain held me up at Colton, California, until this morning. Then heavy fog and rain made it necessary for me to wait until after 12 o'clock before it was possible to take off for Los Angeles."
 The New York Times, May 8, 1930, page 08: "Hop today planned by Goldsborough: by Frank Goldsborough"
 The New York Times, May 9, 1930, page 15: "Goldsborough  lands at El Paso for the night"
 The New York Times, May 10, 1930, page 03: "Goldsborough races storm to Tulsa: by Frank Goldsborough"
 The New York Times, May 12, 1930, page 03: "Flier, 19 ends trip minus compass: by Frank Goldsborough"
 The Washington Post, July 16, 1930, page 01: "Frank Goldsborough Joins Father in Death. Crash Injuries Fatal to Son of Flier Who Died in Ocean Mystery. Goldsborough Dies of Crash Injuries. Son of Flier Who Lost Life in Atlantic Mystery Passes in Coma. Held Airplane Records. Bennington, Vermont, July 16, 1930 (Associated Press)"
 The New York Times, July 16, 1930, page 03: "Find Goldsborough near death on peak"
 The New York Times, July 17, 1930, page 01: "Goldsborough, boy flier, dies of injuries. Unconscious to End After Vermont Crash. Bennington, Vermont; July 16, 1930."
 The New York Times, July 18, 1930, page 28: "Goldsborough felt warning of disaster. Tonawanda Man Discloses That Flier Left Dog Mascot With Him. Funeral Here Today. Tonawanda, New York; July 17, 1930 (Associated Press)"
 The New York Times, July 19, 1930, page 06: . Lindbergh Sends Flowers to Funeral of 19-Year-Old Victim of Plane Crash. Funeral services for Frank Goldsborough, 19-year-old son of the late Brice Goldsborough, who disappeared at sea in the transatlantic amphibian Dawn in 1927, were held yesterday."
 Time, July 28, 1930

1910 births
1930 deaths
Accidental deaths in Vermont
American aviation record holders
Aviators from Washington, D.C.
Aviators killed in aviation accidents or incidents in the United States
Victims of aviation accidents or incidents in 1930
Burials at Kensico Cemetery